The 1976 Eisenhower Trophy took place 13 to 16 October at the Penina Hotel & Golf Resort in Portimão, Algarve, Portugal. It was the tenth World Amateur Team Championship for the Eisenhower Trophy. The tournament was a 72-hole stroke play team event with 38 four-man teams. The best three scores for each round counted towards the team total.

Great Britain and Ireland won the Eisenhower Trophy for the second time, finishing two strokes ahead of the silver medalists, Japan, who had also been runners-up in 1974. Australia took the bronze medal, three strokes further behind, while team Republic of China finished fourth. Chen Tze-ming from Republic of China and Ian Hutcheon, representing Great Britain and Ireland, had the lowest individual scores, one-over-par 293.

Teams
38 four-man teams contested the event.

Scores

Sources:

Individual leaders
There was no official recognition for the lowest individual scores.

Source:

References

External links
Record Book on International Golf Federation website

Eisenhower Trophy
Golf tournaments in Portugal
Eisenhower Trophy
Eisenhower Trophy
Eisenhower Trophy